Easy Energy of Massachusetts, commonly referred to as Easy Energy, is an approved participant in the New England Power Pool and is licensed by the State Department of Public Utilities, Electric Power Division to sell electricity in Massachusetts. The company is headquartered in Bolton, Massachusetts and supplies electricity to residential, industrial and commercial customers in the parts of Massachusetts that fall within National Grid or NSTAR service territory.

Consumers may choose between fixed and variable price as well as standard electricity generated by a mix of fossil fired and hydro power plants or a premium "green" electricity product that is sourced from 100% solar power generation.

Easy Energy provides electricity to more than 5,800 customers in Massachusetts. Approximately 40% of these customers are small businesses.  Easy Energy has also signed four cities and towns that purchase electricity for municipal use.  In July 2009 Selectmen of the town of Bolton, Massachusetts voted to switch the electricity supplier for municipal buildings and streetlights from National Grid to Easy Energy.

References 

Electric power companies of the United States
Companies based in Massachusetts
American companies established in 2007
Energy companies established in 2007